Walter Edward Sweeney (born 23 April 1949) is a British Conservative politician, now closely affiliated with the UK Independence Party.

Member of Parliament
Sweeney contested Stretford in 1983, but Labour's Tony Lloyd beat him by 4,432 votes.

In 1992, he was elected MP for the Vale of Glamorgan by 19 votes, defeating Labour's John Smith who had won the seat in a 1989 by-election. In the 1997 Labour landslide, however, Sweeney lost the seat back to Smith.

After Parliament
Sweeney stood for nomination as Beverley and Holderness' UKIP representative in the 2015 United Kingdom general election, but failed to gain the vote, leading to Gary Shores representing the party. 

In 2008, Sweeney, a member of the executive committee of The Freedom Association, made a surprise political re-appearance, standing as an Independent against the Conservative candidate in the Haltemprice and Howden by-election.

He stood in the 2012 election for Police and Crime Commissioner for Humberside as an Independent. He finished sixth with 5,118 votes.

Personal life
Sweeney lives in Beverley, Yorkshire with his wife, Nuala Sweeney. Together they manage Newbegin House B&B. He has three daughters.

Sources
Times Guide to the House of Commons, Times Newspapers Limited, 1997

References

Other Websites
 Sweeney to run against Smith again (2008)
 Yorkshire Post political coverage on Walter Sweeney

1949 births
Living people
Conservative Party (UK) MPs for Welsh constituencies
UK MPs 1992–1997
Alumni of Darwin College, Cambridge
Place of birth missing (living people)
British people of Irish descent
Members of the Freedom Association
Independent British political candidates
Politics of the Vale of Glamorgan
British Eurosceptics